Onomatopoeia is the only album by Flobots members under the alias Jonny 5 + Yak.  Jonny 5 (James Laurie) and Yak (Farhad Ebrahimi) had previously released music under the name The Flobots, and Laurie would later reprise the Flobots name in future releases without Ebrahimi.  Released locally in 2001, the album featured David Gralow on guitar, Terrence Favors on cello, and Jaymz Haynes on bass. The album has since been re-printed and re-released by Jonny 5 due to fan interest, with all proceeds going towards the Flobots' own charity.

The track 'S.P.A.R.' sees Jonny 5 confronting André 3000 over André's homophobic lyrics in Outkast's track Mamacita, as Jonny (being an open fan of his) took severe issue with said hateful content.  The title track 'Onomatopoeia' ended up in a 2001 compilation by the MIT Songwriting Club at Ebrahimi's alma mater. In that compilation the band was credited as "Flobots (a.k.a. Jonny5 and Yak)" in the liner notes.

Track listing

Note: Tracks 14–21 are four-second long silent tracks.

References

External links
http://www.whosampled.com/Jonny-5-%2B-Yak/

Flobots albums
2001 debut albums